Abbas Saeidi Tanha (born 4 January 1981) is an Iranian former cyclist.

Palmares

2005
1st Stage 4 Tour of Iran (Azerbaijan)
2006
2nd Asian Games Team Time Trial
2008
1st Stage 1 International Presidency Tour
2nd Overall Kerman Tour
1st Stage 2
2009
1st Stage 5 Tour d'Indonesia
2nd Overall Milad De Nour Tour
2010
1st Overall Kerman Tour
1st Stages 1 (TTT) & 2
1st Stage 4 International Presidency Tour
2011
1st  National Road Race Championships
2012
2nd National Time Trial Championships
2nd Overall Tour of Iran (Azerbaijan)

References

1981 births
Living people
Iranian male cyclists
Cyclists at the 2004 Summer Olympics
Asian Games medalists in cycling
Cyclists at the 2002 Asian Games
Cyclists at the 2006 Asian Games
Cyclists at the 2010 Asian Games
Medalists at the 2002 Asian Games
Medalists at the 2006 Asian Games
Asian Games silver medalists for Iran
Olympic cyclists of Iran
People from Zanjan, Iran
21st-century Iranian people